Australia's Got Talent is an Australian reality television show, based on the original UK series, to find new talent. The sixth season aired on the Seven Network from 16 April 2012 until 25 July 2012. Dannii Minogue, Brian McFadden and Kyle Sandilands returned as judges, as well as Grant Denyer as host. The auditions took place from October–December 2011, and the filming of the show took place from February–March 2012. Todd McKenney was a guest judge at the Melbourne auditions, in the absence of Sandilands, and the second show of the finals showdown, in the absence of McFadden. This was Minogue and McFadden's final series as judges, as they were replaced by Dawn French, Geri Halliwell and season 5 contestant Timomatic in season 7.

Auditions
There are various options for auditioning, such as attending the correct venue on the correct day with the questionnaire (which can be found on the website or completed on audition day), sending a DVD in with the act on it, or applying online. The following list contains all of the cities, venues and dates of the auditions. Todd McKenney was a guest judge at the Melbourne auditions in the place of Kyle Sandilands.

Semi-finalists

Semi-final summary
The "Order" columns lists the order of appearance each act made for every episode.

Semi-final 1

Semi-final 2

Semi-final 3

Semi-final 4

Semi-final 5

Notes
1 Flair Riders performed outside the studio due to safety concerns. The judges did not have buzzers in the studio instead having "X" signs, no judges used them however.

Semi-final 6

Semi-final 7

Semi-final 8

Finals summary 
The "Order" columns lists the order of appearance each act made for every episode.

Final showdown 1

Final showdown 2 

Notes
McKenney replaced McFadden during his absence.

Grand Final

Ratings
 Colour key:
  – Highest rating episode and week during the series
  – Lowest rating episode and week during the series

References

Australia's Got Talent
2012 Australian television seasons